The 1973 TAA Formula Ford Driver to Europe Series was an Australian motor racing competition open to Formula Ford racing cars.
It was the fourth annual Australian national series for Formula Fords.

The series was won by John Leffler, driving a Bowin P4a and a Bowin P6F.

Schedule

The series was contested over nine rounds.

Series results

All cars were powered by 1.6 litre Ford engines.

References

TAA Formula Ford Driver to Europe Series
Australian Formula Ford Series